François Schlechter (born 9 May 1933) is a Luxembourgian wrestler. He competed in the men's Greco-Roman bantamweight at the 1960 Summer Olympics.

References

External links
 

1933 births
Living people
Luxembourgian male sport wrestlers
Olympic wrestlers of Luxembourg
Wrestlers at the 1960 Summer Olympics
Sportspeople from Luxembourg City